The Knoxville metropolitan area, commonly known as Greater Knoxville, is a metropolitan statistical area (MSA) centered on Knoxville, Tennessee, the third largest city in Tennessee and the largest city in East Tennessee. It is the third largest metropolitan area in Tennessee. In 2020, the Knoxville metro area (the MSA as defined by the United States Census Bureau) had a population of 879,773. The Knoxville–Morristown–Sevierville Combined Statistical Area (CSA) had a population of 1,156,861 according to the census bureau in 2020.

Definitions
As defined at the time of the 2010 United States Census, the Knoxville area was the third largest Metropolitan Statistical Area (MSA) in Tennessee. It retained that ranking in the 2020 United States census.

For Census purposes, the Knoxville MSA was defined in 2013 to consist of the following nine Tennessee counties:
Anderson 
Blount
Campbell
Grainger 
Knox
Loudon
Morgan
Roane
Union

Though sometimes considered to be part of the Knoxville metro area, the Census Bureau officially classifies Sevier County separately as the Sevierville micropolitan area, while Jefferson County is included in the Morristown metropolitan area.

The Knoxville MSA is the chief component of the larger Knoxville–Morristown-Sevierville, TN Combined Statistical Area (CSA), which also includes the Morristown metropolitan area (Hamblen, Jefferson, and Grainger counties) and the Sevierville (Sevier County), LaFollette (Campbell County), Harriman (Roane County), and Newport (Cocke County) Micropolitan statistical areas.

History
U.S. federal government definitions of the Knoxville metropolitan area have varied over time. The metropolitan area was first defined in 1947 and consisted of Anderson, Blount and Knox counties. Union was added in 1970, and the area was renamed the Knoxville Standard Metropolitan Area. Grainger, Jefferson and Sevier counties were added in 1980, and it became the Knoxville Metropolitan Statistical Area. Grainger and Jefferson counties lost metropolitan status in 1990. Loudon County was added in 2000. Grainger County was re-added in 2013.

In new federal definitions of metropolitan areas announced in February 2013, the Knoxville Metropolitan Statistical Area was redefined. Campbell, Grainger, Morgan and Roane Counties were added to the MSA, making it a nine-county metropolitan region. Three of the four added counties were previously classified as components of the CSA, when Campbell and Roane counties were treated as the LaFollette and Harriman micropolitan areas, respectively, while Grainger County was part of the Morristown Metropolitan Statistical Area. Morgan County was not previously included in any metropolitan or micropolitan area, nor was it previously considered part of the CSA. The 2010 population of the redefined MSA was 837,571, making it 64th largest of MSAs in the United States.

The February 2013 announcement also included a new definition of the CSA associated with the Knoxville metropolitan area, renaming it the Knoxville–Morristown–Sevierville, TN Combined Statistical Area. In addition to the Knoxville MSA, the CSA includes the Morristown MSA and the Newport, Tennessee, and Sevierville Micropolitan Statistical Areas. The newly defined CSA consists of the same twelve counties as the previous CSA, plus Morgan County. As of 2010, the Knoxville CSA ranked as 51st largest in the United States with a 2010 census population of 1,077,073. It has an estimated 1,096,961 residents as of 2014, making it the 50th largest CSA.

Knoxville Economic Area
As of 2004, the federal government's Bureau of Economic Analysis (BEA) identified the Knoxville Economic Area as consisting of the Knoxville–Sevierville–LaFollette CSA (as it was then defined) plus Bell County, Kentucky, and Claiborne, Hancock, Monroe, Morgan and Scott counties in Tennessee. BEA defines economic areas as metropolitan or micropolitan statistical areas that form regional centers of economic activity, plus the surrounding counties that are determined to be economically related to these centers of activity, based on a combination of census commuting data and newspaper circulation data supplied by the Audit Bureau of Circulations. The Knoxville Economic Area was one of 179 economic areas that the BEA identified in the United States as of 2004.

Combined Statistical Area
The Knoxville–Morristown–Sevierville Combined Statistical Area consists of the following:

Counties
 Anderson
 Blount
 Campbell
 Cocke
 Grainger
 Hamblen
 Jefferson
 Knox
 Loudon
 Morgan
 Roane
 Sevier
 Union

Communities

Places with more than 100,000 inhabitants
Knoxville (Principal city)

Places with 10,000 to 33,000 inhabitants
Alcoa
Clinton
Farragut
Halls Crossroads (Census-designated place)
Lenoir City
Maryville
Morristown (principal city)
Oak Ridge
Powell (Census-designated place)
Sevierville (principal city)
Seymour (Census-designated place)

Places with 1,000 to 10,000 inhabitants
Bean Station
Blaine
Caryville
Coalfield (census-designated place)
Dandridge
Eagleton Village (census-designated place)
Fincastle (census-designated place)
Gatlinburg
Greenback
Harriman
Jacksboro
Jefferson City
Jellico
Karns (census-designated place)
Kingston
LaFollette
Luttrell
Loudon
Louisville
Mascot (census-designated place)
Maynardville
Midtown (census-designated place)
New Market
Newport
Norris
Oliver Springs
Pigeon Forge
Plainview
Rockwood
Rocky Top
Rutledge
Strawberry Plains (census-designated place)
Tellico Village (census-designated place)
Vonore (Partial)
Wears Valley (census-county division)
Wildwood (census-designated place)
White Pine

Places with less than 1,000 inhabitants
Baneberry
Fair Garden (census-designated place)
Friendsville
Oakdale
Parrottsville
Petros (census-designated place)
Philadelphia
Pittman Center
Rockford
Sunbright
Townsend
Walland (census-designated place)
Wartburg

See also
 List of micropolitan statistical areas
 Tennessee census statistical areas

References

External links

 
Metropolitan areas of Tennessee
 
Regions of Tennessee